Hibiscus malacophyllus is a species of flowering plant in the family Malvaceae. It is found only in Yemen. Its natural habitats are subtropical or tropical dry forests and subtropical or tropical dry shrubland.

References

malacophyllus
Endemic flora of Socotra
Vulnerable plants
Taxonomy articles created by Polbot
Taxa named by Isaac Bayley Balfour